The 1914 Championship of Australia was an Australian rules football match that took place on 3 October 1914. The championship was contested by the premiers of the VFL, Carlton and the premiers of the SAFL, Port Adelaide. The match was played at Adelaide Oval in Adelaide, South Australia. The match, played in front of 5,000, was won by Port Adelaide by a margin of 34 points, giving Port Adelaide its record 4th Championship of Australia Title. This was the last Championship of Australia match to be held until 1968.

Teams
Port Adelaide were without the services of Ashley, Dunn and Cocks with their respective places taken by Wisdom, Middleton and Lincoln respectively.

Scorecard

References 

Championship of Australia
Championship of Australia
October 1914 sports events